Johanna Müller (born 9 January 1991) is a German judoka.

She is the bronze medallist of the 2016 Judo Grand Slam Abu Dhabi in the -57 kg category.

References

External links
 

1991 births
Living people
German female judoka
21st-century German women